Daniel Toth (born 10 June 1987) is an Austrian professional footballer midfielder who plays for SC Neusiedl am See 1919.

Later career
On 11 May 2021 it was confirmed, that Toth would return to his former club SC Neusiedl am See 1919 on 1 July 2021 as a playing assistant manager.

References

External links
Team profile

1987 births
Living people
Association football midfielders
Austrian footballers
Austria youth international footballers
Austria under-21 international footballers
SC-ESV Parndorf 1919 players
SV Ried players
FC Admira Wacker Mödling players
SC Neusiedl 1919 players
Austrian Football Bundesliga players
2. Liga (Austria) players